William McIntosh (1775–1825) was a Creek Nation chief.

William McIntosh may also refer to:

William McIntosh (footballer), Scottish international footballer
Will McIntosh, American science fiction writer
Willie McIntosh, Scottish curler
William M'Intosh (1838–1931), Scottish physician and marine zoologist
William M'Intosh (fur trader) (died 1832), fur trader and treasurer of the Indiana Territory
William McIntosh (politician), soldier and politician from Massachusetts

See also
William Priestly MacIntosh (1857–1930), Australian sculptor
William Mackintosh (disambiguation)